Pope Shenouda may refer to:

 Pope Shenouda I of Alexandria (r. 859–880)
 Pope Shenouda II of Alexandria (r. 1032–1046)
 Pope Shenouda III of Alexandria (r. 1971–2012)